Neil Priestley (born 23 June 1961) is a former English cricketer. Priestley was a left-handed batsman who fielded as a wicket-keeper. He was born in Blyborough, Lincolnshire.

Career 
Priestley made a single first-class appearance for Northamptonshire against the touring Sri Lankans in 1981. He batted once in this match, scoring 20 not out in Northamptonshire's first-innings, while behind the stumps he took a single catches and made 2 stumpings. He made no further appearances for Northamptonshire.

He later made his debut for Lincolnshire in the 1983 Minor Counties Championship against Hertfordshire. He played Minor counties cricket for Lincolnshire from 1983 to 1990, which included 57 Minor Counties Championship appearances and 13 MCCA Knockout Trophy matches. He made his List A debut against Surrey in the 1983 NatWest Trophy. He made a further List A appearance for Lincolnshire, against Gloucestershire in the 1990 NatWest Trophy. In his 2 List A matches for the county, he scored 78 runs at an average of 39.00, with a high score of 54. This score, which would be his only List A fifty, came in the match against Gloucestershire.

It was however for the Minor Counties cricket team that Priestley made the majority of his List A appearances for, debuting for the team in the 1986 Benson & Hedges Cup against Northamptonshire. He made 5 further appearances for the team, the last of which came against Somerset in the 1989 Benson & Hedges Cup. In these 6 List A matches, he scored 95 runs at an average of 15.83, with a high score of 37. Behind the stumps he took 4 catches and made 2 stumpings.

References

External links
Neil Priestley at ESPNcricinfo
Neil Priestley at CricketArchive

1961 births
Living people
People from West Lindsey District
English cricketers
Northamptonshire cricketers
Lincolnshire cricketers
Minor Counties cricketers